Events in 2007 in Japanese television.

Debuts

Ongoing shows
Music Fair, music (1964–present)
Mito Kōmon, jidaigeki (1969-2011)
Sazae-san, anime (1969–present)
FNS Music Festival, music (1974–present)
Panel Quiz Attack 25, game show (1975–present)
Soreike! Anpanman. anime (1988–present)
Downtown no Gaki no Tsukai ya Arahende!!, game show (1989–present)
Crayon Shin-chan, anime (1992–present)
Shima Shima Tora no Shimajirō, anime (1993-2008)
Nintama Rantarō, anime (1993–present)
Chibi Maruko-chan, anime (1995–present)
Detective Conan, anime (1996–present)
SASUKE, sports (1997–present)
Ojarumaru, anime (1998–present)
One Piece, anime (1999–present)
Yu-Gi-Oh! Duel Monsters GX, anime (2004-2008)
Sgt. Frog, anime (2004-2011)
Bleach, anime (2004-2012)
Eyeshield 21, anime (2005-2008)
Kitty's Paradise PLUS, children's variety (2005-2008)
Doraemon, anime (2005–present)
Kirarin Revolution, anime (2006-2008)
D.Gray-Man, anime (2006-2008)
Gintama, anime (2006-2010)
Pocket Monsters Diamond & Pearl, anime (2006-2010)

Endings

See also
2007 in anime
2007 Japanese television dramas
2007 in Japan
2007 in Japanese music
List of Japanese films of 2007

References